Gandhi Teerth (Gandhi Research Foundation) is a research institution and museum on Mahatma Gandhi, in Jalgaon, Maharashtra, India. Its initiated and promoted by the Gandhi Foundation. This is located 60 km away from Ajanta Caves. It was established on 25 March 2012.

Gandhi Research Foundation (GRF), was inaugurated by President of India, Pratibha Patil on 25 March 2012. It was founded by  Bhavarlal Jain.

The structure was built sustainable and scientifically in Jodhpur stone, under a green norms in view to last for centuries.  Includes auditorium, an amphitheater, meeting / classrooms and guest houses.

The library and archives have specially treated preserved historic documents for researchers on Gandhiji. There is a shop having Khadi clothing, handmade gift items and Gandhian literature.

About Gandhi Museum
Museum building has 30 interactive segments, which equipped with Audiovisual Systems, Touch screen, Bio-scope, etc. describing Mahatma Gandhi.  It has multi lingual audio guided, air-conditioned museum, on the life and works of Mahatma Gandhi.  It takes approx 2 hours 30 minutes time led by amiable guides.

Awards
 GRIHA Adarsh Award 2014.
 Artists in Concrete Awards Asia Fest 2013 - 14

References

External links 
 Outside view - Google Walk-through Gandhi Teerth: Green Campus
 Inside view - Google Walk-through towards Gandhi Museum

History museums in India
History of museums
Natural history museums in India
Art museums and galleries in India
Archaeological museums in India
Gandhi museums
Tourist attractions in Jalgaon district